Kyra Downton (November 13, 1913 – February 6, 1999) was an American equestrian. She competed in two events at the 1968 Summer Olympics.

References

1913 births
1999 deaths
American female equestrians
American dressage riders
Olympic equestrians of the United States
Equestrians at the 1968 Summer Olympics
Pan American Games medalists in equestrian
Pan American Games gold medalists for the United States
Pan American Games silver medalists for the United States
Equestrians at the 1967 Pan American Games
Sportspeople from Vladivostok
Medalists at the 1967 Pan American Games
20th-century American women